Banska Selnica is a small village in Karlovac County, Croatia. Banska selnica is 18.7km (cca. 11.62 miles) away from Karlovac. It is located south of the Kupa river and the D36 road.

According to the Croatian Bureau of Statistics, in 2001, its population was 122.

References

 Popis stanovništva 2001., www.dzs.hr
 Naselja i stanovništvo Republike Hrvatske 1857.-2001., www.dzs.hr

Populated places in Karlovac County